Mallard Bay is an unincorporated community in Wagoner County, Oklahoma, United States. The elevation is 607 feet.

References

Unincorporated communities in Oklahoma